Samuel Oldham Peyton (January 8, 1804 – January 4, 1870) was a U.S. Representative from Kentucky.

Born in Bullitt County, Kentucky, Peyton completed preparatory studies.
He was graduated from the medical department of Transylvania University, Lexington, Kentucky, in 1827 and began practice in Hartford, Kentucky.
He served as member of the Kentucky House of Representatives in 1835.

Peyton was elected as a Democrat to the Thirtieth Congress (March 4, 1847 – March 3, 1849).
He was an unsuccessful candidate for reelection in 1848 to the Thirty-first Congress.

Peyton was elected to the Thirty-fifth and Thirty-sixth Congresses (March 4, 1857 – March 3, 1861).
He was an unsuccessful candidate for renomination in 1860.
He resumed the practice of medicine.
He died in Hartford, Kentucky, January 4, 1870.
He was interred in Oakwood Cemetery.

References

1804 births
1870 deaths
Transylvania University alumni
Democratic Party members of the Kentucky House of Representatives
Physicians from Kentucky
People from Bullitt County, Kentucky
Democratic Party members of the United States House of Representatives from Kentucky
People from Hartford, Kentucky
19th-century American politicians